Sand Fork may refer to:

Sand Fork (Little Kanawha River), a stream in West Virginia
Sand Fork, West Virginia, a town